The 2000–01 Nordic Football Championship was the fourteenth and final Nordic Football Championship staged. Six Nordic countries participated, Denmark, the Faroe Islands, Finland, Iceland, Norway and Sweden. The tournament was partially played during a joint training camp in La Manga, Spain.

Standings

Results

Winners

Statistics

Goalscorers

See also
Balkan CupBaltic CupCentral European International CupMediterranean Cup

References

External links
2000–01 Nordic Football Championship at RSSSF

2000-01
2000–01 in European football
2000 in Swedish football
2001 in Swedish football
2000 in Norwegian football
2001 in Norwegian football
2000 in Finnish football
2001 in Finnish football
2000 in Icelandic football
2001 in Icelandic football
2000 in Faroe Islands football
2001 in Faroe Islands football
2000–01 in Danish football
International association football competitions hosted by Finland
International association football competitions hosted by the Faroe Islands
International association football competitions hosted by Iceland
International association football competitions hosted by Sweden